The minute is a unit of time usually equal to  (the first sexagesimal fraction) of an hour, or 60 seconds. In the UTC time standard, a minute on rare occasions has 61 seconds, a consequence of leap seconds (there is a provision to insert a negative leap second, which would result in a 59-second minute, but this has never happened in more than 40 years under this system). Although not an SI unit, the minute is accepted for use with SI units. The SI symbol for minute or minutes is min (without a dot). The prime symbol is also sometimes used informally to denote minutes of time.

History
Al-Biruni first subdivided the hour sexagesimally into minutes, seconds, thirds and fourths in 1000 CE while discussing Jewish months.

Historically, the word "minute" comes from the Latin pars minuta prima, meaning "first small part".  This division of the hour can be further refined with a "second small part" (Latin: pars minuta secunda), and this is where the word "second" comes from.  For even further refinement, the term "third" ( of a second) remains in some languages, for example Polish (tercja) and Turkish (salise), although most modern usage subdivides seconds by using decimals.  The symbol notation of the prime for minutes and double prime for seconds can be seen as indicating the first and second cut of the hour (similar to how the foot is the first cut of the yard or perhaps chain, with inches as the second cut).  In 1267, the medieval scientist Roger Bacon, writing in Latin, defined the division of time between full moons as a number of hours, minutes, seconds, thirds, and fourths (horae, minuta, secunda, tertia, and quarta) after noon on specified calendar dates. The introduction of the minute hand into watches was possible only after the invention of the hairspring by Thomas Tompion, an English watchmaker, in 1675.

See also
 Clock face
 International System of Units
 Latitude and longitude
 Orders of magnitude (time)

Notes and references

Bibliography 
 Henry Campbell Black, Black's Law Dictionary, 6th Edition, entry on Minute. West Publishing Company, St. Paul, Minnesota, 1991.
 Eric W. Weisstein. "Arc Minute." From MathWorldA Wolfram

Orders of magnitude (time)
Units of time